The rhetorical modes (also known as modes of discourse) are a long-standing attempt to broadly classify the major kinds of language-based communication, particularly writing and speaking, into narration, description, exposition, and argumentation. First attempted by Samuel P. Newman in A Practical System of Rhetoric in 1827, the modes of discourse have long influenced US writing instruction and particularly the design of mass-market writing assessments, despite critiques of the explanatory power of these classifications for non-school writing.

Definitions 
Different definitions of mode apply to different types of writing.

Chris Baldick defines mode as an unspecific critical term usually designating a broad but identifiable kind of literary method, mood, or manner that is not tied exclusively to a particular form or genre.  Examples are the satiric mode, the ironic, the comic, the pastoral, and the didactic.

Frederick Crews uses the term to mean a type of essay and categorizes essays as falling into four types, corresponding to four basic functions of prose:  narration, or telling; description, or picturing; exposition, or explaining; and argument, or convincing.  This is probably the most commonly accepted definition.

Susan Anker distinguishes between nine different modes of essay writing:  narration, or writing that tells stories; illustration, or writing that gives examples; description, or writing that creates pictures in words; process analysis, or writing that explains how things happen; classification, or writing that sorts things into groups; definition, or writing that tells what something means; comparison and contrast, or writing that shows similarities and differences; cause and effect, or writing that explains reasons or results; and argument, or writing that persuades.

Each fiction-writing mode has its own purposes and conventions. Literary agent and author Evan Marshall identifies five different fiction-writing modes: action, summary, dialogue, feelings/thoughts, and background. Author and writing-instructor Jessica Page Morrell lists six delivery modes for fiction-writing: action, exposition, description, dialogue, summary, and transition. Author Peter Selgin refers to methods, including these six: action, dialogue, thoughts, summary, scene, and description.

Narration
The purpose of narration is to tell a story or narrate an event or series of events. This writing mode frequently uses the tools of descriptive writing (see below), but also exposition. Narration is an especially useful tool for sequencing or putting details and information into some kind of logical order, traditionally chronological. Working with narration helps us see clear sequences separate from other modes.

A narrative essay recounts something that has happened.  That something can be as small as a minor personal experience or as large as a war, and the narrator's tone can be either intimate and casual or neutrally objective and solemn.  Inevitably, a good part of narration is taken up with describing.  But a narrative essay differs from a descriptive one in its emphasis on time and sequence.  The essayist turns storyteller, establishing when and in what order a series of related events occurred.

Exactly the same guidelines that hold for a descriptive or narrative essay can be used for the descriptive or narrative paragraph.  That is, such a paragraph should be vivid, precise, and climactic, so that the details add up to something more than random observations.

Examples of narration include:

Anecdote
Autobiography
Biography
Novel
Oral history
Short story
Travel literature

Description
The  purpose of description is to re-create, invent, or visually present a person, place, event, or action so that the reader can picture that which is being described. Descriptive writing can be found in the other rhetorical modes.

A descriptive essay aims to make vivid a place, an object, a character, or a group.  It acts as an imaginative guide to stimulate the thoughts of the reader in the form of allowing the mind to personally interact with what the writer has molded through literary enhancement of thoughtful impressions. 
The writer tries, not simply to convey facts about the object, but to give readers a direct impression of that object, as if they were standing in its presence.  The descriptive writer's task is one of translation:  he wants to find words to capture the way his five senses have registered the item, so a reader of those words will have a mental picture of it.

Essays whose governing intent is descriptive or narrative are relatively uncommon in college writing.  Exposition and argument tend to prevail.

Exactly the same guidelines that hold for a descriptive or narrative essay can be used for the descriptive or narrative paragraph.  That is, such a paragraph should be vivid, precise, and climactic, so that the details add up to something more than random observations.

Examples include:
Journal writing
Poetry

Exposition

Expository writing is a type of writing where the purpose is to explain, inform, or even describe. It is considered one of the four most common rhetorical modes.

The purpose of expository writing is to explain and analyze information by presenting an idea, relevant evidence, and appropriate discussion. In narrative contexts (such as history and fiction), exposition provides background information to teach or entertain. In other nonfiction contexts (such as technical communication), the purpose is to teach and inform.

The four basic elements of expository writing are the subject being examined; the thesis, or statement of the point the author is trying to prove; the argument, or backing, for the thesis, which consists of data and facts to serve as proof for the thesis; and the conclusion, or restatement of the proved thesis.  There are two types of subject, according to Aristotle:  thesis, or general question such as, "Ought all people to be kind to one another?" and hypothesis, or specific question:  "Ought Elmer to be kind to his enemy Elmo?"  One may be aided in the proper formation of a thesis by asking the questions an sit, "Does it exist?"; quid sit, "What is it?"; and quale sit, "What kind is it?"

Examples include:
 Business
Business letters
Reports
Press releases
 Journalism
How-to essays, such as recipes and other instructions
News article
 Personal
Personal letters
Wills
 Academic and technical communication
Scientific writing
Scientific reports
Scientific journal articles
Academic writing
Term papers
Textbooks
General reference works
Encyclopedia articles
Technical writing
User guides
Technical standards

An expository essay is one whose chief aim is to present information or to explain something.  To expound is to set forth in detail, so that a reader will learn some facts about a given subject.  However, no essay is merely a set of facts.  Behind all the details lies an attitude, a point of view.  In exposition, as in all the other modes, details must be selected and ordered according to the writer's sense of their importance and interest.  Though the expository writer isn't primarily taking a stand on an issue, he can't—and shouldn't try to—keep his opinions completely hidden.  There is no interesting way of expounding certain subjects without at least implying a position.

Argumentation 
An argument is a discussion between people representing two (or more) sides of an issue.  It is often conducted orally, and a formal oral argument is a debate.

The purpose of argumentation (also called persuasive writing) is to prove the validity of an idea, or point of view, by presenting sound reasoning, discussion, and argument to thoroughly convince the reader. Persuasive writing/persuasion is a type of argumentation with the additional aim to urge the reader to take some form of action.

Examples include:
 Advertising copy
 Critical reviews
 Critiques
 Editorials
 Job application letter
 Job evaluation
 Letter of recommendation
 Letters to the editor
 Résumés

When an essay writer's position is not implied but openly and centrally maintained, the essay is argumentative.  An argument is simply a reasoned attempt to have one's opinions accepted.  The ideal is to present supporting evidence which points so plainly to the correctness of one's stand that one can afford to be civil and even generous toward those who believe otherwise.

Another form of persuasive rhetoric is the use of humor or satire in order to make a point about some aspect of life or society. Perhaps the most famous example is Jonathan Swift's "A Modest Proposal".

See also
Fiction writing
Literature

Notes

References

External links
The Expository Essay
What is Expository Writing?

Narratology
Composition (language)
Modes